Inga Rhonda King (also known as I. Rhonda King; born 21 April 1960) is a Saint Vincent and the Grenadines accountant, teacher and publisher who has served as the country's Permanent Representative to the United Nations since September 2013.

Early life and education
King was born in Curaçao, Netherlands Antilles and is Vincentian by descent. She has a bachelor's of science degree in chemistry and mathematics from the State University of New York at Albany.

Career
King is a certified accountant and financial manager. She has also worked in publishing, business development and academia. She taught English as a foreign language in China from 2002 to 2003 and has been a volunteer mathematics teacher for at-risk children in Miami.

In 2003, King published her biography as a collection of essays called Journal of a Superfluous Woman in which she narrates her experience with breast cancer.

In 2006, King founded Strategy Forum Inc, an independent publisher of illustrated books. She is also an artist.

From 2010, King was Chairperson of National Investment Promotions in Kingstown. She was also appointed honorary consul for Portugal. In 2011, she became chair of St Vincent and the Grenadines' investment promotion agency.

King was appointed as Permanent Representative to the United Nations by Prime Minister Ralph Gonsalves on 13 September 2013. She has spoken on behalf of the L.69 Group of Developing Countries. In January 2016, St Vincent and the Grenadines voting rights were suspended due to outstanding payment of dues. King said it was a clerical error which would be fixed promptly.

On 29 September 2016, King was elected chair of the UN Fifth Committee (Administrative and Budgetary). On 27 April 2017, she spoke at the General Assembly to champion the resolution to include World Creativity and Innovation Day on the UN Days of Observance.

On 26 July 2018, King was elected to be the seventy-fourth President of the UN Economic and Social Council.

Publications

External links
 Planetary Security Initiative Interview with H.E. Ms. Inga Rhonda King

References

Living people
Saint Vincent and the Grenadines women diplomats
Permanent Representatives of Saint Vincent and the Grenadines to the United Nations
Curaçao women in politics
Curaçao educators
Curaçao businesspeople
University at Albany, SUNY alumni
Saint Vincent and the Grenadines writers
Saint Vincent and the Grenadines women writers
Women ambassadors
1960 births